Amani Fancy (born 14 July 1997) is an English pair skater. With former skating partner Christopher Boyadji, she is the 2015 CS Tallinn Trophy bronze medalist and a two-time British national champion (2014 and 2016).
After that she was a pro ice-skater on the German TV show Dancing On Ice (2019).

Personal life 
Amani Fancy was born on 14 July 1997 in London, England. She lived in Oman as a child.

Career

Single skating 
Fancy began learning to skate as an eight-year-old at a small ice rink in Oman. She competed in ladies' singles until the end of the 2012–13 season. She won the junior bronze medal at two consecutive British Championships and was sent to the 2013 World Junior Championships, where she placed 41st. She was coached by Igor Novodran in Oberstdorf, Germany.

Pair skating 
In spring 2013, Fancy teamed up with Christopher Boyadji to compete in pair skating. In November 2013, the pair won the British national title ahead of defending champions Stacey Kemp / David King. Fancy/Boyadji placed 15th at the 2014 European Championships in Budapest, Hungary, and 18th at the 2014 World Championships in Saitama, Japan.

Following an elbow surgery in November 2014, they were unable to compete at the 2015 British Championships. They were sent to the 2015 European Championships in Stockholm, where they placed 12th. The pair finished 16th at the 2015 World Championships in Shanghai.

Fancy/Boyadji won the bronze medal at the 2015 CS Tallinn Trophy and placed 8th at a Grand Prix event, the 2015 NHK Trophy, as well as winning their second national title. In January 2016, they withdrew from the 2016 European Championships and announced the end of their partnership. They were coached by Alexander König and Mark Naylor in Oberstdorf, Germany.

Programs

With Boyadji

Ladies' singles

Competitive highlights 
GP: Grand Prix; CS: Challenger Series; JGP: Junior Grand Prix

Pairs with Boyadji

Ladies' singles

References

External links 
 
 

1997 births
British female pair skaters
British female single skaters
Living people
Sportspeople from London